The Battle of Tirurangadi (also called the Battle of Calicut) was a series of engagements that took place between 7 and 12 December 1790 at Tirurangadi near the port of Calicut on the Malabar Coast of India, during the Third Anglo-Mysore War.

A British Bombay Army force landed at Tellicherry and with the aid of sepoys and horses provided by Travancore, defeated Tipu's commander, Hussain Ali Khan, at Calicut.  Abercromby then went on to capture "all of Malabar."

See also
Kingdom of Mysore

References

Harbottle, Thomas Benfield.  Dictionary of battles from the earliest date to the present time
Mill, James. A history of British India, Volume 5
Miles, W (translator). The history of the Reign of Tipu Sultan
Logan, William Malabar Manual, Volume 1

External links 
Dictionary of Indian Biography - James Hartley 1743-1799 archive.org
Portrait and Biographical Information on James Hartley Christies.com auctioneers
Heritage History - Mysore Wars
 Calicut - Gazetteer 1857
DNB Biography of James Hartley

Tirurangadi
History of Kozhikode
Mysorean invasion of Malabar
Tirurangadi
Tirurangadi
Tirurangadi
1790 in India